Nancy Keating is an American physician who works at the Brigham and Women's Hospital and is a professor at Harvard Medical School. Her research considers the factors that influence quality care for people suffering from cancer.

Early life and education 
Keating grew up in Maryland. She attended Fallston High School. Keating was an undergraduate student at Virginia Tech, where she majored in biochemistry. She was a medical student at the University of Chicago Pritzker School of Medicine and completed her internships and residency at the Brigham and Women's Hospital. She was a medical clinical fellow at the Harvard Medical School. Alongside her fellowship in health care policy, Keating was a student in the Harvard T.H. Chan School of Public Health where she earned a Master's in public health and specialized in clinical effectiveness.

Research and career 
Keating was appointed to the faculty at the Harvard Medical School in 1998. She was awarded the Society of General Internal Medicine Outstanding Junior Investigator Award in 2005, and promoted to Professor in 2014. Her research considers healthcare equity and improving access to quality cancer care.

Keating is a member of the National Cancer Institute Cancer Care Outcomes Research and Surveillance (canCORS) consortium. CanCORS examines the treatment pathways and outcomes of patients with colorectal cancer. She analyzed the quality of cancer care for people in the Veterans Health Administration. She considered how geography, ethnicity and age impacted veteran health outcomes. She showed that cancer-related imaging was lower in the Veterans Health Administration than in the fee-for-service Medicare. She also showed that Black veterans were considerably less likely to receive surgery for early stage lung cancer or appropriate radiotherapy than their white counterparts.

Keating is interested in end-of-life care for people who experience advanced cancer. She showed that variations in the intensity of end-of-life treatment have less to do with patients' wishes than they do with treatment availability and a physician's discomfort in speaking about end-of-life choices. Keating is committed to oncologists providing appropriate and correct information to people with cancer. She has shown that very few people with fatal cancers have an accurate understanding of their illness, with almost half not every talking to their parents about their life expectancy. She has examined variations in the cost and quality of cancer care across Massachusetts.

Keating is evaluating the Oncology Care Model of the Centers for Medicare & Medicaid Services. The Oncology Care Model provides a new approach to delivering oncology services, using new financial incentives and appropriate levels of care across the United States.

Awards and honors 
 2006 Elected Fellow of the American College of Physicians
 2010 Elected Fellow of the American Society for Clinical Investigation
 2011, 2013, 2015, 2017 Harvard Medical School Excellence in Tutoring Award 
 2015 Harvard Medical School A. Clifford Barger Excellence in Mentoring Award
 2017 Elected Fellow of the Association of American Physicians
 2018 University of Chicago Alumni Association Distinguished Service Award         
 2019 Health Affairs Top Ten Article of 2018

Selected publications

Personal life 
Keating was married in 2003.

References 

Harvard School of Public Health alumni
Living people
Pritzker School of Medicine alumni
Virginia Tech alumni
Year of birth missing (living people)
People from Maryland
20th-century American physicians
21st-century American physicians
Harvard Medical School faculty